FC Cimişlia is a Moldovan football club based in Cimişlia, Moldova. They play in the Moldovan "B" Division, the third division in Moldovan football.

League results 
{|class="wikitable"
|-bgcolor="#efefef"
! Season
! Div.
! Pos.
! Pl.
! W
! D
! L
! GS
! GA
! P
!Cup
!colspan=2|Europe
!Top Scorer (League)
!Head Coach
|-
|align=center|2010–11
|align=center|3rd"Center"
|align=center|9/10
|align=center|18
|align=center|2
|align=center|3
|align=center|13
|align=center|24
|align=center|65
|align=center|9
|align=center|2nd PR
|align=center colspan=2|—
|align=left|
|align=left|
|-
|align=center|2011–12
|align=center|3rd"South"
|align=center|
|align=center|
|align=center|
|align=center|
|align=center|
|align=center|
|align=center|
|align=center|
|align=center|1st PR
|align=center colspan=2|—
|align=left|
|align=left| Sergiu Spatarel
|}

External links
Official website
Cimişlia on Soccerway.com

Cimislia, FC
Cimislia, FC
2009 establishments in Moldova